Rēzeknes Vēstis is a regional newspaper published in Latvia.

Mass media in Rēzekne
Newspapers published in Latvia